Cormeilles is a commune located in the Eure department in the Normandy region of France.

Population

The inhabitants are called Cormeillais.

Geography
Cormeilles is located in the north-western part of the Eure department, on the small river Calonne, which empties into the Touques. Cormeilles is part of the Pays d'Auge.

Economy
The largest distillery of Calvados in Normandy is located in Cormeilles.

International relations
Cormeilles is twinned with Chepstow, and has been since 1975. Cormeilles is also twinned with Decs in Hungary, and has been since 2001.

See also
Communes of the Eure department

References

External links

Gazetteer Entry

Communes of Eure